Kathleen is a census-designated place (CDP) in Polk County, Florida, United States. The population was 3,280 at the 2000 census. It is part of the Lakeland–Winter Haven Metropolitan Statistical Area.

History
A post office called Kathleen has been in operation since 1886. The community was named for Catherine Prine, an early settler.

Geography

Kathleen is located at  (28.121494, -82.026303).

Demographics

As of the census of 2000, there were 3,280 people, 1,162 households, and 900 families residing in the CDP. The racial makeup of the CDP was 93.87% White, 1.71% African American, 0.43% Native American, 0.21% Asian, 0.12% Pacific Islander, 2.56% from other races, and 1.10% from two or more races. Hispanic or Latino of any race were 7.56% of the population.

There were 1,162 households, out of which 37.8% had children under the age of 18 living with them, 61.5% were married couples living together, 11.3% had a female householder with no husband present, and 22.5% were non-families. 17.7% of all households were made up of individuals, and 6.1% had someone living alone who was 65 years of age or older.  The average household size was 2.82 and the average family size was 3.19.

In the CDP, the population was spread out, with 28.3% under the age of 18, 8.1% from 18 to 24, 30.0% from 25 to 44, 23.8% from 45 to 64, and 9.8% who were 65 years of age or older.  The median age was 36 years. For every 100 females, there were 98.5 males.  For every 100 females age 18 and over, there were 96.2 males.

The median income for a household in the CDP was $39,226, and the median income for a family was $40,925. Males had a median income of $33,442 versus $21,066 for females. The per capita income for the CDP was $17,231.  About 8.9% of families and 10.1% of the population were below the poverty line, including 10.8% of those under age 18 and 13.1% of those age 65 or over.

References

Census-designated places in Polk County, Florida
Census-designated places in Florida
Former municipalities in Florida